Stříbro is a town in Tachov District in the Plzeň Region of the Czech Republic. It has about 7,400 inhabitants. The historic town centre with the Renaissance Stříbro bridge is well preserved and is protected by law as an urban monument zone.

Administrative parts
Villages of Butov, Jezerce, Lhota u Stříbra, Milíkov, Otročín and Těchlovice are administrative parts of Stříbro.

Etymology
The Czech name derives from "silver", which used to be mined there. The German name Mies comes from the name of the river Mies/Mže.

Geography
It lies in the Plasy Uplands. The Mže River flows through the town. The confluence of the river Mže and Úhlavka is located on the southern outskirts of the town. A part of the Hracholusky Reservoir, built on the Mže, lies in the eastern part of the territory.

History

According to the 16th century chronicler Wenceslaus Hajek, the mining settlement in the Duchy of Bohemia was founded by the Přemyslid duke Soběslav I in 1131. The first written mention of Stříbro is in a deed of Duke Frederick from 1183. It was a mining settlement located on an important trade route (Zlatá cesta, "Golden Road") from Prague to Nuremberg. Silver and later mainly lead were mined here, which accelerated the growth of the settlement.

Between 1240 and 1250, the foundations of the new royal town were laid on a rocky promontory above the old settlement. Mies received town privileges in 1263. The Czech name Stříbro is documented from the 14th century onwards.

During the Hussite Wars, the town was besieged by the troops of Jan Žižka in 1421, though it was not occupied until in 1426. Shortly afterwards, the Hussite forces under Prokop the Great could repel an attack by the Crusaders in the Battle of Tachov. In 1541 the citizens turned Protestant. Silver mining was resumed under the King Ferdinand I in 1554. Upon the Battle of White Mountain, the town was subdued to the measures of the Counter-Reformation.

Until 1918, Mies was part of the Habsburg monarchy and of the Cisleithanian ("Austrian") side after the Austro-Hungarian Compromise of 1867. It was the administrative centre of a district (Bezirk) with the same name, one of the 94 Bezirkshauptmannschaften in Bohemia. From 1918, Stříbro belonged to Czechoslovakia. After World War II, the remaining German population was expelled.

Demographics

Sights

The Renaissance Stříbro bridge is a national cultural monument with one preserved gate, built in 1555–1560.

The original town hall building, whose appearance has not been preserved, was replaced in 1543 by the current Renaissance building. The sgraffito decoration dates from 1823–1888.

The Church of All Saints was originally a sanctuary, which disappeared in a late Gothic reconstruction from 1565. The other parts date from 1754–1757, when the building was remodeled in the Baroque style. The church tower serves as lookout tower open to the public.

There are still preserved fragments of town walls, which surrounded the old town in a large circle. They include the so-called Jewish Gate, which made it possible to enter the Jewish quarter.

The mining open-air museum with an outdoor exhibition of mining equipment shows the mining tradition in Stříbro and in whole country.

Notable people
Jacob of Mies (1372–1429), reformer
Vincent Houška (1766–1840), composer and musician
Anton Depauly (1801–1866), painter
Leopold Schmutzler (1864–1940), German painter
Ernst Streeruwitz (1874–1952), Austrian military officer, businessman and politician

Twin towns – sister cities

Stříbro is twinned with:
 Fano, Italy
 Moncoutant, France
 Oelsnitz, Germany
 Vohenstrauß, Germany

Gallery

References

External links

Cities and towns in the Czech Republic
Populated places in Tachov District